Delrey is an unincorporated community in Iroquois County, in the U.S. state of Illinois.

History
A post office was established at Delrey in 1854, and remained in operation until the 1950s. The community's name commemorates the Battle of Molino del Rey in the Mexican–American War.

References

Unincorporated communities in Iroquois County, Illinois
Unincorporated communities in Illinois